The basketball tournament at the 1983 Mediterranean Games was held in Casablanca, Morocco.

Medalists

References
1983 Competition Medalists

Basketball
Basketball at the Mediterranean Games
International basketball competitions hosted by Morocco
1983–84 in European basketball
1983 in Asian basketball
1983 in African basketball